is a Japanese light novel series written by Satoshi Wagahara, with illustrations by Oniku (written as 029). ASCII Media Works has published the series in Japan, while Yen Press has published the series in North America.

The story is about Satan seeking to conquer the world of Ente Isla, but when confronted by the Hero Emilia, he is forced to retreat through a gate that transports him to modern day Tokyo, Japan. To survive and find a way to return to Ente Isla, Satan adopts the name Sadao Maou and gains part-time employment at a fast food restaurant called MgRonald's, a parody of McDonald's. There have been two manga adaptations published by ASCII Media Works in Dengeki Daioh and Dengeki Maoh. A 13-episode anime adaptation produced by White Fox and directed by Naoto Hosoda aired from April to June 2013. A second season produced by 3Hz and directed by Daisuke Tsukushi aired from July to September 2022. A sequel is set to premiere in 2023.

Plot
The Demon Lord Satan seeks to conquer the world of Ente Isla by annexing its four continents with the help of his demon generals Alciel, Lucifer, Malacoda, and Adramelech. After being confronted by the hero Emilia and her companions, after they had killed Malacoda and Adramelech, Satan and Alciel escape the world of Ente Isla through a gate to modern Tokyo, Japan. However, due to the lack of magic in the modern contemporary world, both Satan and Alciel change into forms representing what they would look like if they were human. In order to survive, Satan takes a part-time job in a fast food restaurant named MgRonald's, while Alciel serves as his houseman. One day, Satan, who now goes by Sadao Maō, meets a girl who is actually Emilia in the form of Emi Yusa. The story then unfolds and explores the personalities of each of the characters and their moral values. More characters show up from Ente Isla and they too face the new world dilemmas, often comically.

Characters

Main characters
 

Satan Jacob is the Demon Lord from Ente Isla. Due to the actions of the Hero Emilia Justina and her companions, he was transported to modern day Japan with Ashiya and changed into human form. To survive in Japan, he adopts a Japanese name similar to his original name, Sadao Maou, and works part-time at a MgRonald's franchise, eventually being promoted to a full-time position as the Assistant Shift Manager. He and other demons can turn into their original forms when people around them are filled with despair. However, when he changes his form to his devil form, he uses his powers for good deeds such as repairing the city, which always makes the characters confused due to his position as the Devil King. Throughout the series his current personality is often called into question, though it is later shown that he had always been like that, and was never once this "Evil Overlord" that the people of Ente Isla had grown to fear and hate; in actuality he did the "evil" things he did to help his people, the other demons. As he told Emilia when he saved Chiho, he just wants to protect the people under his care and around him. When he was younger, he was saved and taught by Emi's mother, Lailah. She also gave him a fragment of Sephiroth that would later become his and Emi's appointed daughter Alas Ramus. He would eventually fuse with Alas Ramus' "younger sister" Acieth Alla (who is another fragment of "Yesod") in order to save Emi and Ashiya after they were kidnapped by Olba and the Angels to fight in Ente Isla.
 

Emilia is the hero with thigh-length magenta hair who fended off Satan. After forcing Satan to retreat from Ente Isla, Emilia Justina follows him to modern day Japan to ensure that he is destroyed. Like Maou, she loses most of her magical powers upon her arrival and is forced to assume a Japanese name, Emi Yusa, and find employment as a call center agent. Her father was human and her mother was an archangel. However, during her childhood, Lucifer, one of Maou's generals, led an army of demons to attack her village, resulting in the death of her father. This is revealed to be the reason she wants to kill Maou. However, it was later revealed that her father was alive. Emi is later fired from her job at the call center and gets a new job at MgRonald's where she works with Maou and Chiho. Maou also appoints her as a Demon General of the Demon Army despite her protests. She later develops feelings for Maou, though she struggles to reconcile her feelings due to their previous history along with knowing that Chiho is also in love with him.
 

Ashiya is one of Satan's Generals, who was also transported to modern day Japan with him. Extremely loyal to Satan, Alciel takes care of the domestic duties at home and researches ways to regain their magical powers. On Earth, Alciel assumes the form of Shirō Ashiya who operates as Sadao's housekeeper. Anytime he fails in his duties, he is extremely disappointed in himself for not doing a better job at helping his master, even suffering emotional breakdowns. He is also extremely frugal in his spending habits, once resorting to eating a large amount of leftover udon that was about to expire (which resulted in a severely upset stomach). He has alluded to reciprocate Rika's love, though is currently unwilling to pursue a relationship with her due to believing that she fell in love with his human guise and not his demonic "true self".

Chiho is a high school student who is Sadao's friend and fellow employee at MgRonald. She has feelings for Sadao. Chiho is an average teenage girl of short stature who sports a highly curvaceous figure, a fact which is noted by several people and envied by other girls, especially Emi. She can hear and understand the language of Ente Isla due to accidentally being targeted with a communication spell intended for Emi, because the spell was set to target those who were thinking about Sadao constantly. She later learns how to use the magic spell Idea Link to allow her to alert the others if she is ever in danger. She is also able to use magic to enhance her archery skills. Maou appoints her as a Demon General of the Demon Army much to her happiness, and becomes well respected within the demon community as well. In order to gain the Spear of Adramelechinus (needed to power the Demon's Castle to reach the Angels' stronghold on the moon), she gets involved with the politics in Ente Isla. The light novel ends with her being together with Maou.
 

Lucifer is a fallen angel and one of Satan's generals. After Satan was transported to the human world, Lucifer and Olba struck a deal in order to defeat Satan, with Olba promising to return Lucifer to heaven. After they are defeated by Satan, however, Lucifer moves into the apartment belonging to Sadao and Shirō. He is good with technology and loves playing video games. As a result of committing a series of robberies with Olba before being defeated by Sadao, he must remain in seclusion to avoid the police. To his irritation, he is usually referred to as a hikikomori or NEET, even when guests are present. His mother is the current leader of the angels, Ignora, and his father was the ancient demon lord, Sataniel.
 

Sadao's next door neighbor. She is always wearing a kimono. Suzuno is the grand inquisitor of the Church in Ente Isla that, like Emi, came to kill Sadao. Unlike Emi, she apparently has trouble adjusting to the modern life of Japan and is easily found having trouble, especially with Japan's technology. She has coped with Japan, but with the old style of Japan. She briefly teamed up with Sariel to eliminate both Sadao and Emi after Sariel reminded her of her duties as grand inquisitor, but after seeing Sadao concerned for Chiho and realizing that she values her friendship with Emi and Chiho, she ultimately turns against Sariel by helping Chiho evacuate the area while Satan and Sariel battle one another. She wields a giant mallet, which can be retracted into her flower-shaped hairpin. Maou appoints her as a Demon General of the Demon Army despite her protests. She eventually develops feelings for Maou, though struggles to accept those feelings due to their past history. She is eventually promoted to the post of Archbishop of the Church in Ente Isla.

Other characters

Emi's friend and co-worker at the call center who develops romantic feelings for Ashiya. She later learns the truth about everyone and gets involved in the issues going on in Ente Isla. Although her confession with Ashiya was turned down, she has continued to not give up on him reciprocating her feelings due to him not actually giving her a hard "no" in response to her confession.

The manager of MgRonald's where Sadao and Chiho work. She dreams of opening up her own restaurant, and in a conversation with Maou, discussed the possibility of taking him with her when she does open her own business.

Emilia's friend and comrade from Ente Isla. She is proficient in alchemy and is a court magician. Emeralda is the highest-ranked official who serves directly under the ruler of the Holy Saint Aire Empire, the greatest nation on the Western Continent. After returning from earth, she appears to have developed a liking for Pocky and modern conveniences such as the telephone.

Emilia's friend and comrade from Ente Isla with enhanced strength and speed. He became a lumberjack, living in a forest, away from human society.

The rogue Archbishop of the Church of Ente Isla. He betrayed Emilia and temporarily joined forces with Lucifer to kill Emilia and Satan Jacob. Following the failure of his plans, he is arrested by the police. He had been working with the corrupt Church of Ente Isla to kill those who opposed them, such as the members of the Allied Knight Order and anyone affiliated with them. He was Crestia's superior and would frequently give her assignments involving the brutal slaughter of the Church's enemies. Following his loss to Satan in Sasakuza, he is placed under guard in a hospital, where he regains consciousness after some time. After he escapes, he attempts to reestablish his contract with Lucifer and proceeds to aid Sariel in his battle against Satan by casting a spell to increase his power. It turns out that he had been tricked by Lucifer into creating a panic with the Moon spell, which causes Satan to regain his magic and defeat Sariel. Following Sariel's defeat, he is once again defeated and restrained, this time by Lucifer.
 

An Archangel used by the Church of Ente Isla as part of their Execution Inquisition along with Crestia Bell. He first attacks Emilia at a convenience store while in disguise. In order to learn about Satan Jacob and Emilia in the human world, he forges the identity of "Mitsuki Sarue", claiming to be the manager of the newly opened Sentucky Fried Chicken franchise in Hatagaya. He eventually teams up with Crestia in order to kill Emilia and Satan Jacob. His weapon is a large scythe, and he possesses a power called the "Wicked Light of the Fallen", a magic capable of nullifying all sacred powers, as shown when he battles Emilia. During his battle with Emilia, he demands that she return the holy sword "Better Half" to Heaven. He defeats and tortures Emilia while taking Chiho hostage, but he is ultimately defeated by Satan Jacob. He draws his magic from the Moon, with his power increasing the closer he is to it. He also has perverted tendencies, shown when he expresses a desire to strip Chiho down in his experiments to learn how she has been influenced by Satan's magic. After his defeat he develops an immediate infatuation with the manager of MgRonalds, much to Emilia's annoyance and Kisaki's dismay.

She is the owner of the "Villa Rosa Sasazuka" apartment building where Sadao Maō and Suzuno Kamazuki live. She is very obese and seems to know more than a Japanese person should about the visitors from Ente Isla. It is later revealed that she is the eleventh Sephira for the Earth's Tree of Life, and one of the guardians of Earth.

She is Miki Shiba's niece and initially hires the tenants of Villa Rosa Sasazuka to work at her family's resort for the summer after everyone is kicked out of the complex due to renovations caused by the battle with Gabriel. It is later revealed that she is the Daughter of "Understanding" of Earth (one of the eleven Sephira of Earth's Tree of Life), thus making her a guardian of Earth.

The manager of Fushima Park's MgRonald's branch.

The "daughter" of Satan and Emilia. She was formed by "Yesod" and brought to Japan by Lailah, Emilia's mother and Satan's savior. She later fuses with Emi's sword to help Emi become more powerful.

Alas Ramus' younger sister and another fragment of "Yesod". She lives with Emi's father, Nord Justinia. She later fuses with Maou to help him become more powerful.

The personification of the Gevurah Sephiroth from Entre Isla. Everyone initially came to Japan together with the demon Farfarello to search for the Demon King and convince him to return to Ente Isla and continue his conquest. Eventually breaking off his partnership with the demons, Erone, having recognized Alas Ramus previously during his fight against Emi, returns to Earth to find his "sister". He eventually becomes a ward under the protection of Emi's parents Lailah and Nord Justina.

Emi's mother and an archangel.
 

Emi's father. It was believed that he had perished during Demon General Lucifer's siege on Western Continent, though this is later shown to be false.

He is a first generation Archangel from Ente Isla who commands the lower ranking angels. He descends from Heaven in order to reclaim the fragments of "Yesod" after Sariel fails to take the Sacred Sword from Emilia. His weapon of choice is the secret sword Durandall.

He is the Minister of the Demon World and the Deputy Demon King during Satan's absence.

He is an angel from Ente Isla. He is assigned with the task of monitoring the actions of every angel and for announcing the declaration of an angel turning into a fallen angel, also called the Declaration of Fallen.

Chiho's classmate, who seemly has an affinity for boy's love.

Chiho's father. He is a police officer working in Japan.

Chiho's mother. She is a housewife

Media

Light novels
The Devil Is a Part-Timer! began as a light novel series written by Satoshi Wagahara, with illustrations by the artist 029 (Oniku). Wagahara originally entered the first novel in the series, originally titled , into ASCII Media Works' 17th Dengeki Novel Prize in 2010 and the novel won the Silver Prize. The first novel was published by ASCII Media Works on February 10, 2011, under their Dengeki Bunko imprint, with an additional 20 main novels, two prequel novels, one spin-off novel, and six bonus novels being released since. The final main novel was initially scheduled to be published on July 10, 2020 but was delayed to August 7, 2020 as a result of the effects caused by COVID-19. Two bonus novels (Hataraku Maō-sama! 4.1 and Hataraku Maō-sama! Tengo) were packaged with the first and second Blu-ray volumes (respectively) of the anime adaptation's second season.

The series is licensed in North America by Yen Press, with the first main novel being released on April 21, 2015 and the last main novel on April 19, 2022.

Manga
A manga adaptation, illustrated by Akio Hiiragi, started serialization in the February 2012 issue of ASCII Media Works' shōnen manga magazine Dengeki Daioh. The first tankōbon volume was published on June 27, 2012. Yen Press publishes the manga in North America from March 24, 2015.

Spin-off
A spin-off manga series set in an alternate universe titled , written by Satoshi Wagahara and illustrated by Kurone Mishima, began serialization in the July 2012 issue of ASCII Media Works' Dengeki Maoh magazine. Its chapters have been compiled in five tankōbon volumes, released between January 26, 2013, and April 24, 2015. Yen Press released all five volumes in North America between March 24, 2015 and October 25, 2016.

Other
A four-panel manga anthology volume was published by ASCII Media Works on June 27, 2013. Another spin-off manga series titled , illustrated by Oji Sadō, began serialization on Kadokawa Corporation's Comic Walker website on August 28, 2019. It has been collected in 3 volumes as of March 2021.

Anime

A 13-episode anime television series adaptation of The Devil Is a Part-Timer!, produced by White Fox and directed by Naoto Hosoda, aired between April 4 and June 27, 2013. The anime has Masahiro Yokotani as the script supervisor and Atsushi Ikariya adapts 029's characters' designs. Funimation streamed the series as it aired and released it on home video in summer 2014. It was later streamed on the FunimationNOW service but the show was moved to the similar Crunchyroll streaming service after Sony Pictures Television and Aniplex (via Funimation Global Group) purchased the assets of Crunchyroll from WarnerMedia in 2021. The opening theme is "Zero!!" by Minami Kuribayashi. Muse Communication holds the distribution rights in Southeast Asia.

A second season was announced at the Kadokawa Light Novel Expo 2020 event on March 6, 2021, with the main cast reprising their roles. The second season, titled The Devil Is a Part-Timer!!, is animated by 3Hz, with Daisuke Tsukushi directing, Yūdai Iino designing the characters, Yoshihiro Takeda serving as chief animation director and the rest of the staff returning from the first season. The second season aired from July 14 to September 29, 2022, on Tokyo MX. Muse Communication licensed the second season in Southeast Asia.

A sequel was announced following the conclusion of the second season. It is set to premiere in 2023.

Notes

References

External links

 Hataraku Maō-sama! at ASCII Media Works 
 Anime official website 
 

2010s fantasy novels
2011 Japanese novels
2012 manga
2013 anime television series debuts
2022 anime television series debuts
3Hz
 Anime and manga about parallel universes
 Anime and manga based on light novels
 ASCII Media Works manga
 Comedy anime and manga
 Crunchyroll anime
 Demons in anime and manga
Demons in written fiction
Dengeki Bunko
 Fantasy anime and manga
Dengeki Daioh
Funimation
 Japanese fantasy novels
Kadokawa Dwango franchises
Light novels
Seinen manga
Shōnen manga
 Television shows based on light novels
 Tokyo MX original programming
 Upcoming anime television series
 Video games about demons
 White Fox
 Yen Press titles